Creepypastas are horror-related legends that have been shared around the Internet. Creepypasta has since become a catch-all term for any horror content posted onto the Internet.  These Internet entries are often brief, user-generated, paranormal stories intended to scare readers. They include gruesome tales of murder, suicide, and otherworldly occurrences. The subject of creepypasta varies widely and can include topics such as ghosts, murder, zombies, rituals to summon paranormal entities and haunted television shows and video games. Creepypastas range in length from a single paragraph to lengthy, multi-part series that can span multiple media types.

In the mainstream media, creepypastas relating to the fictitious Slender Man character came to public attention after the 2014 "Slender Man stabbing", in which a 12-year-old girl was stabbed by two of her friends; the perpetrators claimed they "wanted to prove the Slender Man skeptics wrong." After the murder attempt, some creepypasta website administrators made statements reminding readers of the "line between fiction and reality".

Other notable creepypasta stories include "Ben Drowned", "Jeff the Killer", "Ted the Caver" and "Sonic.exe".

Etymology
Creepypasta is a portmanteau of the words creepy and copypasta; the term was coined on the imageboard 4chan around 2007. Copypasta denotes viral, copied and pasted text; the term was coined on 4chan around 2006.

History
The exact origins of creepypasta are unknown. Early creepypastas were usually written anonymously and routinely re-posted, making the history of the genre difficult to study. Jessica Roy, writing for Time, argued that creepypastas emerged in the 1990s when the text of chain emails was reposted on Internet forums and Usenet groups. Aja Romano, writing for The Daily Dot, stated that Ted the Caver was arguably the earliest example of creepypasta. The story, posted on Angelfire in 2001, was written in the first person from the perspective of Ted as he and several friends explored an increasingly frightening cave system.

Many early creepypastas consisted of rituals, personal anecdotes and urban legends such as Polybius and Bunny Man. Darcie Nadel, writing for TurboNews, argued that these early creepypastas had to be somewhat believable and realistic to be re-posted. Many of the earliest creepypastas were created on the /x/ board of 4chan, which focused on the paranormal.

Major dedicated creepypasta websites started to emerge in the late 2000s to early 2010s: Creepypasta.com was created in 2008, while the Creepypasta Wiki and r/NoSleep (a Reddit forum, or subreddit) were both created in 2010. The websites created a permanent archive of creepypasta, which profoundly impacted the genre. Many authors started using creepypasta characters in their own stories, which resulted in the development of continuities encompassing numerous works.

According to Time magazine, the genre had its peak audience in 2010 when it was covered by The New York Times.

The definition of creepypasta has expanded over time to include most horror stories written on the Internet. Over time, authorship has become increasingly important: many creepypastas are written by named authors rather than by anonymous individuals. Many of these authors attempt to achieve notice through their creepypasta. The copying and pasting of creepypastas has become less common over time; doing so is seen as intellectual theft by many members of the creepypasta community.

Examples of creepypasta

Slender Man

Slender Man is a thin, tall humanoid with no distinguishable facial features, who wears a trademark black suit. The character originated in a 2009 Something Awful Photoshop competition, before later being featured as a main antagonist in the Marble Hornets alternate reality game. According to most stories, he targets children. The legend also caused a controversy with the Slender Man stabbing in 2014.

Jeff the Killer
Jeff the Killer is a story accompanied by an image of the title character. In the story, a teenager named Jeff is on his way to school with his younger brother when they are attacked by a group of bullies. Jeff defends himself and his brother and leaves the assailants lying in the street beaten, their hands and arms broken. After his brother claims he injured the bullies and is arrested, Jeff spends several days distraught, before going to a birthday party in the neighborhood where he is attacked by the bullies again. Although he manages to kill all of the assailants, he is severely burned during the confrontation after being set on fire. During a stay at the hospital, Jeff realizes that he enjoys harming people, and goes insane. The night after he is discharged, he slices his face, leaving a scar in the shape of a smile, and cuts off his eyelids, so that he will never sleep. He then murders his parents and brother, whispering "go to sleep" while killing his sibling. He becomes a serial killer who sneaks into houses at night and whispers "go to sleep" to his victims before killing them.

According to The Daily Dot, the legend of Jeff the Killer can be traced back as far as 2008.

11 miles ritual 
In the 11 miles ritual creepypasta, a person who wishes to fulfil one's wish follows 11 miles of an unknown road with a frightening obstacle at each mile. In the case that the ritual doer reaches the 11th mile, then the ritual is said to have been completed, leading to the fulfilment of the wish.

Ted the Caver
Ted the Caver began as an Angelfire website in early 2001 that documented the adventures of a man and his friends as they explored a local cave. The story is in the format of a series of blog posts.  As the explorers move further into the cave, strange hieroglyphs and winds are encountered. In a final blog post, Ted writes that he and his companions would be bringing a gun into the cave after experiencing a series of nightmares and hallucinations. The blog has not been updated since the final post.

In 2013, an independent film adaptation of the story was released, called Living Dark: the Story of Ted the Caver.

Ben Drowned

Created by Internet user Alex Hall (a.k.a. "Jadusable"), Ben Drowned tells a story of a college student named Matt who buys a used copy of the video game The Legend of Zelda: Majora's Mask from an elderly man at a yard sale. Matt finds that the cartridge is haunted by the ghost of a boy named Ben, who drowned. After deleting Ben's savefile, Matt encounters disturbing glitches and scary messages such as "You shouldn't have done that..." and "You've met with a terrible fate, haven't you?".

In May 2015, Variety reported that Clive Barker was developing a television series adaptation of Ben Drowned in partnership with Warner Brothers, but Hall later confirmed that the project was no longer in development.

Mereana Mordegard Glesgorv 
Created by an anonymous user, this story is about a mysterious YouTube video of a man in a dark red room who stares at the camera. The video has no audio; those who view it either go insane and gouge their eyes out or commit suicide; some victims somehow and inexplicably mailed their ripped eyes to YouTube’s headquarters. The video in the story was re-created many times on YouTube.

Sub-genres of creepypasta

Lost episode creepypasta
Lost episode creepypasta describes supposed television episodes, typically kids' shows, that were either never aired or removed from syndication due to their violent and grotesque content. These supposedly lost episodes often focus on suicide or imply the viewer will suffer great harm. Some lost episode creepypastas focus on local public access shows rather than nationally syndicated shows. Notable examples include Squidward's Suicide, Suicidemouse.avi, Dead Bart, and Max and Ruby 0004. There are, however, actual instances of cartoon episodes being pulled off from broadcast due to the episode's content being inappropriate for kids; for example, a Dexter's Laboratory episode, titled "Rude Removal" was never aired due to the episode featuring severe swearing. Another example is the original version of the Teletubbies episode, "The Bear and the Lion", which was banned due to criticism for its unsettling cinematography, character design, and music. A SpongeBob SquarePants episode titled "SpongeBob in RandomLand" had to re-edit a scene that referred to the Squidward's Suicide creepypasta.

Video games
Video game creepypasta focuses on video games containing grotesque or violent content; this content may spill over into the real world and cause the player to harm themselves or others. Many video game creepypastas reveal the conflict to be caused by malevolent entities such as ghosts or artificial intelligence.

Psychotic killers
These creepypastas tell of people, usually a teenager, becoming a psychopath or killer, often involving a trademark disfigurement due to the effects of a bad childhood, accident, bullying, experiment gone wrong, or supernatural menace.

Supernatural monsters
These creepypastas involve either supernatural beings or actual legendary, mythical, and folkloristic monsters.

Rituals and rites 
These creepypastas typically contain instructions on how to perform various entity-summoning rituals, including their do's and don'ts. The main aim of these rituals is to have the ritual doer's wishes realised upon successful completion. Other types of rituals which do not have the effect of granting wishes are often performed for recreation.

Adaptations

 In May 2015, Machinima, Inc. announced plans for a live-action web series curated by Clive Barker, titled Clive Barker's Creepy Pasta, focusing on Slender Man and Ben Drowned; although following the shutdown of Machinima, the series was never produced. 
 Each season of the American television series Channel Zero is based on a different creepypasta. 
 Filmmaker John Farrelly was set to release a film titled The Sleep Experiment based on the Russian Sleep Experiment in 2020, but the project never materialized.

References

Bibliography

External links
Creepypasta.com

 
Computer-related introductions in the 1990s
Fakelore
Horror fiction
Internet memes
2000s fads and trends
2010s fads and trends
2020s fads and trends